Central Dynamo Stadium was a stadium in Moscow, Russia. It was built in 1928 and held 36,540 people. It was the home ground for Dynamo Moscow. It was central venue of the All-Soviet Dynamo sports society and carried special name of Central to denote its importance. Until the construction of the Central Lenin Stadium in 1956, the Central Dynamo Stadium was the central sports facility in Moscow. The stadium was one of the venues of the football tournament of the 1980 Summer Olympics.

A new stadium was built on the same spot and is named VTB Arena.

History
In 1938 the Dinamo station of the Moscow Metro opened nearby. An athletics track circles the football field, but is no longer in use. A monument to Lev Yashin (1929-1990) stands at the stadium's north entrance and VIP boxes are positioned above the entrances to the north and south stands. In 2008 the stadium celebrated its 80-year anniversary.

Michael Jackson brought his HIStory World Tour to Dynamo Stadium in 1996 and Deep Purple performed there the same year.

Dynamo Stadium closed for demolition in 2008, with the farewell match played on 22 November 2008. The stadium's main tenant, FC Dynamo Moscow, moved to Arena Khimki, a stadium in the Moscow suburb of Khimki.

Highlights 
 Size of field:  
 Capacity – 36,540
 Field surface – natural grass
 Dimensions board: 
 Lighting: 1400 lux (4 lighting towers)
 Scoreboard – one on the western platform, electronic

See also
Glasnost Bowl

References

Venues of the 1980 Summer Olympics
FC Dynamo Moscow
Sports venue
Olympic football venues
Sports venues in Moscow
Sports venues built in the Soviet Union
Dynamo sports society
Sports venues demolished in 2011
Defunct football venues in Russia
Demolished buildings and structures in Moscow
Cultural heritage monuments of regional significance in Moscow
1928 establishments in Russia
2011 disestablishments in Russia
Sports venues completed in 1928
Venues of the Friendship Games